The Santangelo novels are a series of novels written by Jackie Collins, which focus on the Santangelo family, particularly Gino Santangelo, an Italian-American former gangster, and his daughter Lucky. The novels, which take place from the 1920s to the present day, are set in the world of organised crime and include the Santangelos' rivalry with the Bonnatti and Kassari families. There are nine novels in the Santangelo saga and one spin-off. Confessions of a Wild Child (2013), is a prequel depicting Lucky's teenage years, which were briefly explored in the first Santangelo novel, Chances (1981).

Main characters
Gino Santangelo – first appears in Chances
Lucky Santangelo – first appears in Chances
Olympia Stanislopoulos – first appears in Chances
Costa Zennocotti – first appears in Chances
Carrie Berkley – first appears in Chances
Steven Berkley – first appears in Chances
Lennie Golden – first appears in Lucky
Brigette Stanislopoulos – first appears in Lucky
Alex Woods – first appears in Vendetta: Lucky's Revenge

Family members
 Paulo Santangelo, d. 1939, married to:
Mira, married until 1910
Vera, married until 1939
Gino Santangelo, 1905-2015 son of Paulo and Mira Santangelo, married to:
Cindy, married 1934-1939 her death
Maria Grazione, married 1949-1955 murdered. 
Susan Martino, married 1979-1983
Paige Wheeler, married 1985–2015
Steven Berkely, b. 1939, illegitimate son of Gino Santangelo and Carrie Berkely, married to:
Zizi, married 1968-1971
Mary Lou Morley, married 1984-1988
Lina, married
Lucky Santangelo, b. 1950 daughter of Gino Santangelo and Maria Grazione, married to:
Craven Richmond, b. 1948, married 1966-1970
Dimitri Stanislopoulos, married 1979-1984
Roberto "Bobby" Stanislopoulos Santangelo, b. 1979 son of Dimitri Stanislopoulos and Lucky Santangelo
Lennie Golden, married 1984–Present
Maria "Max" Santangelo, b. 1986 daughter of Lennie Golden and Lucky Santangelo
Gino Santangelo II, b. 1987 son of Lennie Golden and Lucky Santangelo
Dario Santangelo, b. September 1, 1951 d. 1977, son of Gino Santangelo and Maria Grazione
Brigette Stanislopoulos, b. 1970, daughter of Olympia Stanislopoulos and Claudio Cadducci, at the death of her mother in 1984 she lived with her stepfather Lennie Golden and godmother Lucky Santangelo
Leonardo Golden, illegitimate son of Claudia Bonnatti and Lennie Golden, adopted by Lucky Santangelo

Other characters
 Marco, Gino's bodyguard and later, Lucky's sweetheart, much to her delight. Gunned down in a mob shooting, to Lucky's great sorrow
Bee, Gino's former fiancée and Marco's mom
Santino Bonatti, a mobster
Marabelle Blue, an actress and another former fiancée of Gino's

Other families

Zennocotti-Grazione family
Franklin Zennocotti natural father of Leonora Zenoccotti Grazione, adopted father of Costa Zennocotti
Leonora Zennoccotti Grazione, daughter of Franklin Zennocotti, married to:
Edward Grazione, married 1928
Maria Grazione, b. 1928 d.1955, daughter of Leonora Grazione and Edward Grazione
Costa Zennocotti, adopted son of Franklin Zennocotti (adopted 1921), married to:
Jennifer, d. 1970, married 1934-1970

Gino Santangelo was intended to marry Leonora Zennocotti until she slept with Edward Grazione and became pregnant which spurred a shotgun wedding. Their child, Maria Grazione, married Gino in 1949. As a result of the marriage, Leonora and Edward disowned their daughter.

Richmond family
 Senator Peter Richmond, married to:Betty RichmondCraven Richmond, b. 1948, married to
 Lucky Santangelo', married 1966-1970

Gino married his sixteen-year-old daughter Lucky to Senator Richmond's son Craven to make an alliance between the two families and to exercise some control over his rebellious daughter. Gino's criminal past ruined Senator Richmond's chances for the Republican nomination and the two families did not speak after Lucky's divorce in 1970.

Stanislopoulos family
Dimitri Stanislopoulos, d. 1984, father of Olympia Stanislopoulos and Roberto Stanislopoulos, married to:
Charlotte, an American society wife, mother of Olympia
Lucky Santangelo, married 1979–1984, mother of Roberto
Olympia Stanislopoulos, b. 1948 d. 1984, married to:
Unnamed Greek playboy, married 1967 (four months)
Claudio Cadducci, d. 1970, married 1968-1970
Unnamed Polish Count, married 1970, (sixteen weeks) 
Lennie Golden, married 1984
Roberto (Bobby) Stanislopoulos, b. 1979

Novels

 Chances (1981)
 Lucky (1985)
 Lady Boss (1990)
 Vendetta: Lucky's Revenge (1996)
 Dangerous Kiss (1999)
 Drop Dead Beautiful (2007)
 Poor Little Bitch Girl (2009) 
 Goddess of Vengeance (2011)
 Confessions of a Wild Child (2013)
 The Santangelos (2015)

Television adaptations

Two television miniseries have been made based on the Santangelo novels, which were adapted by Collins herself:Lucky Chances (1990) – based on the novels Chances and LuckyLady Boss (1992) – based on the novel of the same name

The role of Lucky Santangelo was first played by actress Nicollette Sheridan in Lucky Chances, and later by Kim Delaney in Lady Boss.

Film adaptations

In 2017, it was announced that Collins' Santangelo'' series of novels would be adapted into a film trilogy for the big screen by Universal Pictures. The trilogy will be produced by Monumental Pictures partners Debra Hayward and Alison Owen; and Working Title partners Tim Bevan and Eric Fellner. However, as of 2022, no progress has been made on the project.

References

 
Novels by Jackie Collins
Novel series
Novels about organized crime